Brandon Loyvon Heath (born March 1, 1984) is an American professional basketball player who last played for APOEL of the Cyprus Basketball Division 1.

College career
Heath played collegiately at San Diego State University for the Aztecs and left the school as the all-time leader in: scoring (2,189), field goals (749), field goals attempted (1,815), three-point field goals (281), three-point field goals attempted (798), steals (217), games played (125), games started (120), double-digit scoring games (112) and minutes played (4,275). He is also second on the Mountain West Conference all-time points leader board.

Professional career
Heath went undrafted in the 2007 NBA draft. In the 2007–08 season, he played in France for Orléans Loiret Basket, where he averaged 12 points, 2.8 rebounds and 1.9 assists in 25 games.

In July 2008, he joined the Los Angeles Clippers for the 2008 NBA Summer League. On September 10, 2008, he signed with the Los Angeles Lakers. However, he was later waived by the Lakers on October 20, 2008. After not making the Lakers final roster for the 2008–09 season, he was acquired by the Los Angeles D-Fenders of the NBA Development League.

For the 2009–10 season, Heath played for the Cypriot side APOEL and helped his team to win the Cypriot League. He then played from 2010 to 2013 for PBC Lukoil Academic of Bulgaria.

On September 29, 2013, he signed with the Sacramento Kings. However, he was later waived by the Kings on October 15, 2013. In November 2013, he was acquired by the Reno Bighorns. In February 2014, he returned to Bulgaria and signed a one-and a half year contract with Levski Sofia. On April 22, 2015, he left Levski and signed with Club Sagesse of the Lebanese Basketball League.

On September 16, 2015, he signed a one-year deal with Polish club Śląsk Wrocław. On December 15, 2015, he parted ways with Śląsk. On 27 December 27, 2015, he signed again with Cypriot club APOEL, returning to the club after five years. Two months later, he managed to add another trophy to his collection, after winning the Cypriot Cup with APOEL.

References

External links
 Brandon Heath at aba-liga.com
 Brandon Heath at euroleague.net
 Brandon Heath at eurobasket.com
 Brandon Heath at fiba.com
 Brandon Heath at realgm.com
 San Diego State bio

1984 births
Living people
ABA League players
American expatriate basketball people in Bulgaria
American expatriate basketball people in Cyprus
American expatriate basketball people in France
American expatriate basketball people in Lebanon
American expatriate basketball people in Poland
American expatriate basketball people in Venezuela
American men's basketball players
APOEL B.C. players
Basketball players from Los Angeles
BC Levski Sofia players
Los Angeles D-Fenders players
Orléans Loiret Basket players
PBC Academic players
Reno Bighorns players
San Diego State Aztecs men's basketball players
Śląsk Wrocław basketball players
Trotamundos B.B.C. players
Point guards
Sagesse SC basketball players